Henry Mulholland is the name of:

 Henry Mulholland, 2nd Baron Dunleath (1854–1931), Irish Conservative Member of Parliament
 His son Sir Henry Mulholland, 1st Baronet (1888–1971), Northern Ireland politician